Penticton is a city in the Okanagan Valley of the Southern Interior of British Columbia, Canada, situated between Okanagan and Skaha lakes. In the 2016 Canadian Census, its population was 33,761, while its census agglomeration population was 43,432.

Name origin
The name Penticton is derived from a word in the Okanagan language. It is conventionally translated as "a place to stay forever" but is actually a reference to the year-round flow of Okanagan Lake through Penticton where it enters Skaha Lake. Differing accounts of the meaning are given in the BC Geographical Names entry for the city:

History

The site of the city was first settled by the Syilx (Okanagan people), of the Interior Salish languages group, who initially named the community Phthauntac, meaning the "ideal meeting place", followed by Penticton, meaning a "place to stay forever", or officially "a place where people live year-round" in the Okanagan language. They settled around the city's two lakes: Skaha Lake and Okanagan Lake; the former was originally known as Dog Lake. Their descendants form the Penticton Indian Band, a First Nations government part of the Okanagan Nation Alliance situated near Penticton.

In 1866, Irishman Thomas Ellis and his family travelled to Penticton, and became the first white settlers. He started to develop a community by building a cattle empire, and planting fruit trees. The Penticton Hotel was established in 1892 by Ellis, who positioned it around the local government area, and its first road: Front Street. The sidewalks on the street were made from wood, with coal oil lamps being introduced to the sidewalk. Ellis and his relatives retired in 1892, and sold a portion of their land to property dealers. Around this time, a number of European fur traders traveled through Penticton and the surrounding communities.

The sternwheeler SS Aberdeen, which began service on Okanagan Lake in 1892, meant that more services could be shipped to the area. A group of residents formed their own local public government board for the community, by 1907, in the hopes of promoting the area. It was referred to as the Board of Trade, who attempted to specialize in arts, commerce, education, and recreation. Another sternwheeler was constructed at Okanagan Landing and launched that same year, the SS Okanagan, for use on Okanagan Lake, while other sternwheelers served Penticton and other communities on Skaha Lake.

Penticton was incorporated as a district municipality on December 31, 1908. Shortly after the district was incorporated, the fruit trees planted by Ellis, many of them apple trees, started to grow. Residents of the area packed fruit in boxes, so they could distribute it worldwide. In 1912, the Canadian Pacific Railway (CPR) developed the Incola Hotel for the city, which operated for approximately 70 years.

During World War I, the SS Sicamous came to the community, while the Kettle Valley Railway train service began operating, by moving specific passengers. In 1949, Penticton purchased the ship from the Canadian Pacific Railway. The Penticton Regional Airport was developed during World War II due to wartime military air transportation concerns, which acted as an emergency landing strip until its tarmac was completed. Its land was expropriated from the Penticton Indian Band in 1949 under the War Measures Act.

In 1948, a provincial highway opened between Hope and Princeton, which allowed access to Penticton, and created competition for the Kettle Valley Railway; headquarters for the railway were chosen to be in Penticton, in 1910, but the location burnt down in 1964. Much of the railroad's original route has been converted to a multi-use recreational trail, known as the Kettle Valley Rail Trail, which carries the Trans Canada Trail through this part of British Columbia. It was incorporated as a city on May 10, 1948, with the Governor General of Canada declaring this. Reeve Robert Lyon served Penticton as the first mayor, while Lord Alexander was made a freeman of the city.

Geography 

Its borders are formed by Skaha Lake Road to the south and west, which changes to Highway 97 after city limits, Naramata Road to the east, and to the west, Highway 97.

Topography 
Penticton is the largest city by area and population in the Okanagan-Similkameen Regional District, which is part of the Okanagan as a whole, for which the city is the third largest in the region. It is the 21st largest settlement in British Columbia itself by population, while its metropolitan area, including the city plus Okanagan-Similkameen Electoral Area D, serves as the 71st largest in Canada; by area, Penticton ranks 20th in its province; statistics are based on the 2011 Canadian Census. It lies at the south bottom of Okanagan Lake, and north beginning of Skaha Lake. Between Okanagan Lake and Skaha Lake are a number of residential areas, farms, which grow orchard and wine products.

Pine and fir are commonly found in the mountains and high country around Penticton, which include the Okanagan Highland, and to its east, the Monashee Mountains. The Okanagan Highland is an intermediary plateau-like hilly country between the Okanagan Valley and the Monashee Mountains.

Climate 

Penticton has a cold semi-arid climate (Köppen climate classification BSk) bordering on an oceanic climate (Köppen climate classification Cfb) and humid continental climate (Dfb bordering on Dfa). Penticton has low precipitation, hot summer days with cool nights, and moderately cool, mostly cloudy winters. With  of annual precipitation, Penticton is the fourth driest city in Canada. It averages  of snowfall per year. Penticton has the mildest winter of any non-coastal city in Canada.

Penticton experiences 1,923 sunshine hours annually, lower than one might expect in a dry climate. This is the result of temperature inversions during the winter that leave a layer of cloud cover at the top of the valley where warm moist air collides with the cooler dry air that fills the valley. During December and January, Penticton is one of the cloudiest places in Canada. By contrast, the summer months are some of the most cloud-free in the country. Overall the sun shines for 39 percent of daylight hours, varying between a low of 13 percent in December and January to 62.6 percent in August.

Mean relative humidity hovers between 63–77 percent in the morning throughout the year, but afternoon mean relative humidity is more uneven, ranging from 36 percent in July to 69 percent in January and December. The local and upcoming weather of Penticton is observed at the Penticton Regional Airport by Environment and Climate Change Canada. It typically experiences four distinct seasons annually, having hot summers, relatively mild winters, and little snow, according to the British Columbia government based on statistics from Environment Canada. Despite having a mild winter by Canadian standards, Penticton often sees moderate stretches of below freezing weather, typically confined to December and January.

Demographics

In 2016. Penticton has a dwelling occupancy rate of 93.2%. The median value of a private dwelling is $359,167, just under the national median of $374,975. The median age is 52.4, much higher than the national median age of 41.2. 29.0% of residents are 65 years or older, compared to 16.9% nationally.

Ethnicity 
As of 2021, 84.3% of residents are white, while 8.9% are visible minorities, and 6.8% are Indigenous. The largest visible minority groups in Penticton are South Asian (3.2%), Filipino (1.4%), Chinese (1.0%),  and Black (0.7%), and Japanese (0.5%).

Note: Totals greater than 100% due to multiple origin responses.

Language 
As of 2016, 86.4% of residents spoke English as their first language. Other common mother tongues are German (2.2%), Punjabi (1.8%), French (1.8%), Portuguese (0.7%) and Tagalog (0.6%).

Religion 
According to the 2021 census, religious groups in Penticton included:
Irreligion (19,645 persons or 55.0%)
Christianity (14,575 persons or 40.8%)
Sikhism (750 persons or 2.1%)
Hinduism (170 persons or 0.5%)
Buddhism (155 persons or 0.4%)
Islam (90 persons or 0.3%)
Judaism (60 persons or 0.2%)
Indigenous Spirituality (45 persons or 0.1%)

As of 2011, 52.9% of residents were Christian. The largest denominations were Catholic (15.8%), other Christian (14.5%) United Church (8.6%), Anglican (4.7%), and Baptist (2.0%) The largest minority religions were Sikhism, practiced by 1.7% of the population and Buddhism, practiced by 0.5%, while 43.5% held no religious affiliation.

Architecture 
According to SkyscraperPage, there are eight notable buildings in Penticton, the largest of which are the Lakeshore buildings, which are 15 floors, with the building's construction by concrete completing in 2008. The building is associated with an engineering organization, construction company, and real estate agency, but was made for residential use. At ten stories each, The Athens Creek Tower and Alysen Place are tied for Penticton's second-tallest building. The third-largest building, Cherry Lane Towers, is eight floors, and is also residential.

Public spaces 

Due to its warm climate, the city has a diverse array of public spaces, from parks to hiking trails. It is home to ten public parks, including Gyro Park, Lakawanna Park, Marina Way Park, Okanagan Lake Park, Penticton Youth Park, Rose Garden, Rotary Centennial Pavilion, Rotary Park, Skaha Lake Park, and Munson Mountain. There are also seven beaches situated in the city, including Okanagan Lake Beach, Skaha Lake Beach, Airport Beach, Marina Way Beach, Okanagan Lake Park Beach, Sudbury Beach, and Three Mile Beach.

The larger metropolitan area contains the Okanagan Falls Provincial Park, located in the unincorporated community Okanagan Falls. Penticton maintains a policy on dogs that are allowed at parks or beaches. Other public spaces include trails, such as part of the Trans Canada Trail, and Kettle Valley Railway; the former was formed throughout Canada, while the latter runs through Penticton and nearby Kelowna. Rock climbing area Skaha Bluffs is located south of city centre on a hillside above the Skaha Lake in the Skaha Bluffs Provincial Park. With over 1,200 documented routes, it is the second most popular rock climbing area in British Columbia, after the Smoke Bluffs in Squamish.

Education 
Penticton is served by School District 67 Okanagan Skaha, a school district with education institutions also based in nearby communities Naramata, Kaleden, and Summerland; its head office is held in Penticton itself. The district administers children from kindergarten to grade 12 locally, those of which are between kindergarten to grade five attend elementary schools, while children in grades between grade six to eight attend middle schools; ninth to 12th graders are served by secondary schools. School District 67 Okanagan Skaha currently maintains 11 elementary schools, four middle schools, and three secondary schools, including Penticton Secondary School and Princess Margaret Secondary School. On June 30, 2016, School District 67 closed McNicoll Park Middle School. During the 2016/2017 school year School District 67 operated 10 elementary schools, 3 middle schools, and 3 high schools. Penticton has three independent schools; Penticton Christian School, Holy Cross School, and Concordia Lutheran School.

The Conseil scolaire francophone de la Colombie-Britannique operates two Francophone schools: école Entre-lacs primary school and the école secondaire de Penticton.

The city is home to a Sprott Shaw College campus, and an Okanagan College campus, the latter of which, in 2010, had an enrollment of 610. It also contains the Okanagan Hockey School, which has had partnerships with professional hockey teams, such as the Vancouver Canucks.

The Penticton Public Library was founded in 1909; from 1948 to 1968, it was a part of the Okanagan Regional Library. In 1968, a successful referendum separated the library from the Okanagan Regional Library.

Sports

The city hosts games played by ice hockey teams Penticton Vees, a junior "A" team in the British Columbia Hockey League, and one of the most successful Junior A teams in Canadian history. (BCHL), The city formerly hosted the Penticton Lakers, a junior "B" team in the Kootenay International Junior Hockey League (KIJHL). The Vees play at the South Okanagan Events Centre, while the latter played in the arena of the neighboring Okanagan Hockey School. The former were founded in 1961, and have won the Doyle Cup, and Royal Bank Cup, while the latter were established in 2009. The Penticton Upperdeck Vees are also a junior ice hockey that were founded in 2008, and also play at the South Okanagan Events Centre; people who have special needs are part of the team's squad, which is in the Special Needs Hockey League (SNHL).

The Penticton Pinnacles are a soccer team that were established in 1997 that play at the Kings Park for the Pacific Coast Soccer League (PCSL), the Penticton Pistoleras, a local roller derby team part of the South Okanagan Roller Derby Association, and Penticton Harlequins, a local rugby team in the British Columbia Rugby Union, also play tournaments for the city; the South Okanagan Event Centre serves as both of their venues.

Beside team sports, the city hosted the 2010 British Columbia Scotties Tournament of Hearts, 2010 World Junior A Challenge,  2013 Continental Cup of Curling., the 2016 BC Winter Games, the 2017 International Triathlon Union Multisport World Championships and Curling Canada's 2018 Scotties Tournament of Hearts.

Events
Penticton hosts many events annually, among them the Super League Penticton Triathlon, the Valley First Granfondo Axel Merckx Okanagan, the Okanagan Wine Festival, the Okanagan Children's Festival, Meadowlark Nature Festival,  Which takes place on the May long weekend Fest-of-Ale BC, the Penticton Peach Festival (commonly known as "Peachfest"), the Miss Penticton Pageant, which takes place during the Penticton Peach Festival, the Pentastic Hot Jazz Festival, the Peach City Beach Cruise, and the Elvis Festival, which was featured in the Summer 2006 issue of British Columbia Magazine. Penticton was home to the Ironman Canada race from 1983 until 2012.

Recreation

Penticton offers many kinds of recreation, including skiing at the Apex Mountain Resort ski area; boating and fishing on Skaha Lake and Okanagan Lake, golfing on the area's many courses, hiking and biking the Kettle Valley Railway Trail, and rock climbing at Skaha Bluffs. In the summer many people enjoy floating down the river channel that connects Okanagan Lake and Skaha Lake. It is home to the BCHL hockey team Penticton Vees who play throughout the winter season, and the PCSL soccer team Penticton Pinnacles, who play May–July.

Completed in 2011, the Penticton Community Centre is a modern facility with many health, fitness and recreation options. The Penticton Community Centre is located at 325 Power Street.

In September 2006, Penticton residents voted 80.3% in favour of the construction of the South Okanagan Events Centre (SOEC). The $73 million arena, sports complex and convention centre is the home of the BCHL's Penticton Vees, named in honour of the senior hockey team that won the 1955 Ice Hockey World Championships against Russia. The SOEC also serves as a summer or early fall training facility for the Vancouver Canucks. It has boosted the city's convention market and is a popular venue for concert tours and other special events. Notable shows hosted at the SOEC in recent years have been Rihanna, Ringo Starr & His All-Starr Band, Def Leppard, Carrie Underwood and several Cirque du Soleil shows.

From May–October, outdoor markets fill the downtown section of Main St. Two markets, the Downtown Community Market and the Penticton Farmers Market combine to form one of the largest outdoor market events in BC. Visitors come from all around for this Saturday event which sees about 8,000 visitors at its peak in July–August.

The Penticton Art Gallery (formerly the Art Gallery of the South Okanagan) is a registered not-for-profit charitable organization. Exhibits feature international and local artists, and the gallery offers art workshops and seasonal events. During the winter holidays, there is a special "art under $500" event.

Penticton is the hub of wine tourism in the Okanagan Valley, with 120 wineries within an hour's drive and over 40 wineries within city limits. Craft beer, distilled spirits, and cider are also widely manufactured.  Penticton is known for its early involvement in the craft brewing movement and is a featured route in BC Ale Trails.

The Kettle Valley Rail Trail, with trail heads leading to more than 160 km of flat, railbed trails for hiking and biking, can be accessed from Penticton. This trail is part of the Trans Canada Trail.

Infrastructure

Transportation 

Mass local transit in Penticton and Okanagan-Similkameen is offered by the South Okanagan-Similkameen Transit System under the BC Transit label, operating on six routes. There is also a service for people who are unable to use regular transit, HandyDART. The bus transportation system is funded by Penticton, Okanagan-Similkameen, and BC Transit. Its services are provided to points of interest, such as the Cherry Lane Shopping Centre Downtown Penticton.  as well as traversing the distance lake to lake.

A number of parks and recreation transportation services are offered in the city, including trails, such as part of the Trans Canada Trail, and Kettle Valley Railway; the former runs through Canada, while the latter runs through Penticton, and Kelowna. Headquarters for the trail was chosen to be in Penticton in 1910, but the location burnt down in 1964. The city has access to transportation corridors running north, south, east, and west, while the Highway 97 can also be accessed.

In 2018 a $6million upgrade to the facility was initiated to expand the departure and arrivals lounges as well as increase capacity for managing passenger flow. Although it has historically provided flights to several destinations, the airport currently offers flights to the Vancouver International Airport, which are provided by Air Canada Express; these services are provided three to four times daily, while the exception of Sunday, when two flights are available. WestJet Encore flies twice daily to its Calgary hub. The city is also home to the Penticton Water Aerodrome , a water aerodrome situated adjacent to the Penticton Airport and is home base to HNZ Topflight, an advanced helicopter flight training school operated by HNZ.

Notable residents

Jeannette Armstrong, Syilx Elder, Author, and Professor at UBCO 
Andy Bell, pro freestyle motocross champion, host of MTV's Nitro Circus
George Bowering, poet, first ever Canadian Parliamentary Poet Laureate
Tyler Breeze, professional wrestler
Layla Claire, soprano
Thomas Ellis, the first European settler in the area in 1866
Brett Hull, National Hockey League (NHL) hockey player, graduate of Penticton High School
Paul Kariya, retired NHL player, graduate of Penticton Secondary School
Duncan Keith, NHL hockey player, graduate of Penticton Secondary School
Alan Kerr, hockey player
Shane Koyczan, spoken word poet
Spencer Krug, musician from the band Wolf Parade
Richard H. Leir, chief of maritime operations for the Canadian navy.
Ivan McLelland, Penticton Vees player and 1955 IIHF World Hockey Champion
Andy Moog, hockey player
Brendan Morrison, NHL hockey player, graduate of Penticton High School
Terry David Mulligan, actor and television personality
Andi Naude, 2018 Olympian on the Canadian National Ski Team
Bob Nicholson, CEO of the Edmonton Oilers
Nakai Penny, professional rugby player for the Seattle Seawolves of Major League Rugby
Cameron Phillips, radio broadcaster
Justin Pogge, hockey player
Mike Reno, musician from the band Loverboy
Mark Allan Robinson, political activist
Alexis Smith, actress
Blake Wesley, hockey player

Media

Radio stations
 AM 800 – CKOR, soft adult contemporary
 FM 92.9 - CFUZ-FM, Community radio station Peach City Radio
 FM 93.7 – CBTP-FM, CBC Radio One
 FM 97.1 – CJMG-FM, hot contemporary (Sun FM)
 FM 100.7 – CIGV-FM, country music

International relations 
In early 1975, residents of the Penticton area travelled to Japan, in order to search for business opportunities. They met Kaneyasa Marutani, the mayor of Ikeda, Hokkaido, a town in the Nakagawa regional district of Japan. He claimed that the town was proposing a sister city relationship, and stated that Penticton was a reasonable option, due to its similarities with winery production, cattle industry, and geographic features. Later that year, residents of the Ikeda area toured Penticton and met with the government of Penticton, reaching a decision to become a sister city in 1977.

Since 1977, Penticton has served as a sister city of Ikeda. The relationship is one of the oldest in Canada, with a number of residents having exchanged visits to the respective locations annually. In 1993, there was consideration for building a Japanese garden in Penticton, in order to honour their agreement, with the garden's construction beginning in 1997. It is known as the Penticton–Ikeda Japanese Garden.

See also
Dominion Radio Astrophysical Observatory
Penticton Herald
Penticton (crater)
Penticton (electoral district)
List of mayors of Penticton

References

Footnotes

Bibliography

External links

 
Cities in British Columbia
Populated places in the Okanagan Country
Populated places on Okanagan Lake
British Columbia populated places on the Okanogan River